Pasir Gogok is a small village in Kota Tinggi District, Johor, Malaysia.

References

Kota Tinggi District
Villages in Johor